The Whip and the Body is a 1963 gothic horror film directed by Mario Bava under the alias "John M. Old". The film is about Kurt Menliff (Christopher Lee) who is ostracized by his father for his relationship with a servant girl and her eventual suicide. He later returns to reclaim his title and his former fiancée Nevenka (Daliah Lavi) who is now his brother's wife. Menliff is later found murdered, but the locals believe his ghost has returned to haunt the castle for revenge.

Italian censors removed the film from cinemas due to its sadomasochistic themes. The international cut features some significant changes, and runs for 77 minutes. It was released theatrically as What! and Night Is the Phantom in the United States and United Kingdom, respectively.

Plot 

An isolated castle on the Eastern European coast. Kurt (Christopher Lee), the older son of Count Menliff (Gustavo De Nardo), was in marriage preparations with Nevenka (Daliah Lavi). However, Kurt had an affair with Tania, the daughter of Menliffs' servant Giorgia (Harriet Medin), and Tania committed suicide because of Kurt's prospective marriage. Count Menliff rejected Kurt and he left the castle. Meanwhile, Nevenka married Cristiano (Tony Kendall), Kurt's younger brother.

One day, Kurt arrives at the castle, superficially to celebrate Cristiano and Nevenka but in fact he is to reclaim his title and fortune, which supposedly also includes Nevenka. During an evening on the beach and following a session of flogging and sex, masochistic Nevenka understands that she is still in love with Kurt. Frustrated, she does not return to the castle and is eventually found unconscious by the butler Losat (Luciano Pigozzi). On the same night, Kurt is killed under curious circumstances, with the same dagger Tania had committed suicide with. Now, Kurt is dead but a series of events hints that his ghost has started to haunt the castle for revenge.

Cast 
 Daliah Lavi as Nevenka
 Christopher Lee as Kurt Menliff
 Tony Kendall as Christian Menliff
 Ida Galli (as Isil Oberon) as Katia
 Harriet Medin (as Harriet White) as Giorgia
 Gustavo De Nardo (as Dean Ardow) as Count Menliff
 Luciano Pigozzi (as Alan Collins) as Losat
 Jacques Herlin as the Priest

Sources:

Production 
The credited screenwriters are Ernesto Gastaldi (as Julian Berry), Ugo Guerra (as Robert Hugo), and Luciano Martino (as Martin Hardy). Gastaldi has stated that he had written the script himself with Guerra possibly contributing to some of the story early on, whilst Martino made no contribution to the script. Gastaldi was shown an Italian print of The Pit and the Pendulum (1961) by the producers who requested a similar film to be made. Gastaldi is credited as an assistant director in the film's credits, but has stated he was never even on the set of the film. Mario Bava was brought in to direct the film through Ugo Guerra's suggestion as he could both direct the film and photograph the film. Bava took care of the cinematography for the film while his regular camera man Ubaldo Terzano is credited as the cinematographer.

The film was shot for under ₤159 million Italian lire on a six-week shooting schedule with one more week for special effects. The film was shot in both Anzio and Castel Sant'Angelo in Rome.

Release 
The film's sadomasochistic theme caused trouble with censors in Italy. The board of censors demanded no cuts to the film, but gave it a V.M. 18 rating meaning that it was forbidden to minors. This was appealed by the production companies for the film who cut parts of the film on their own and later earned a V.M. 14 rating. The Whip and the Body was released in Italy on 29 August 1963 through Titanus. The film was seized on 12 October 1963, with charges of obscenity. The film was declared that it contained "several sequences that refer to degenerations and anomalies of sexual life." The film was then later re-released in January 1964. The law court of Rome ordered the confiscation of several scenes that were described as "contrary to morality". The film poster was to be destroyed and condemned the chief press officer at Titanus to three months on probation. The film grossed a total of 72 million Italian lire.

The Whip and the Body received a release in France under the title Le Corps et le fouet on 26 January 1966. A 77-minute version titled What! was released in the United States in 1965. This version was dubbed in English with none of the actors dubbing their own voices. The 77 minute version was nearly identical to the British edit of the film released under the title Night is the Phantom. Both the American and English versions of the films were heavily edited, in particular having all the whipping scenes removed, causing the film to be incomprehensible.

Home video
A Region 1 DVD of The Whip and the Body was released by VCI on 31 October 2000 with an 88-minute running time. The DVD was sourced from a 35mm print of the film. The disc included an audio commentary with Tim Lucas, isolated soundtrack, photo gallery, cast and crew biographies and filmographies. A Blu-ray of the film was released by Kino on December 17, 2013. The Blu-ray contained a Tim Lucas audio commentary and theatrical trailers.

Reception 
In contemporary reviews, The Monthly Film Bulletin reviewed the 77-minutes English-dubbed version titled Night is the Phantom in 1965. The review referred to the film as "slow, repetitive, verging on parody" and that either "censor or distributor cuts have rendered much of the plot incomprehensible, thought one doubts if it ever made sense entirely." The review compared the film to other genre films of the era, calling it "another of Italy's prankish simulations of British horror movie" as well as stating that "Mario Bava copies [Riccardo] Freda almost slavishly" but "still pulls off some arresting pictorial compositions". "Hogg." of Variety noted that "for sophisitcated audiences, the gothic-novel atmosphere and trappings of secret passages, muddy footprints from the crypt and ghost lover, probably will draw more laughs than gasps. But genuine suspense is maintained throughout." The review commented on the technical elements of the film, stating "superb" cinematography but that the script had "many preposterous lines, and is far too cluttered with cliches such as screams in the night, hurried chases and mystery lights in the crypt."

In 1970, screenwriter Ernesto Gastaldi stated that the film disappointed him. Gastaldi described that he felt about the story “in terms of a psychological nightmare, in the style of Clouzot's films, but Bava saw in it a baroque and decadent drama, and emphasized such tones beyond belief.”

From retrospective reviews, Slant Magazine gave the film four and a half stars out of five, stating that the film found "Bava at the peak of his visual prowess" Online film database AllMovie found that Bava's "exceptional visual style helps to lift an otherwise gloomy picture". The review noted that the film contained a "strong, witty script and one of the finest casts the Italian director ever worked with" resulting in "a solid horror film that works on multiple levels."

See also
 Christopher Lee filmography
 List of French films of 1963
 List of horror films of 1963
 List of Italian films of 1963

References

Footnotes

Sources

External links 
 

Films directed by Mario Bava
Films scored by Carlo Rustichelli
1963 films
Italian horror films
French horror films
1960s Italian-language films
1963 horror films
Titanus films
Gothic horror films
BDSM in films
Films set in the 19th century
Films shot in Rome
Films with screenplays by Ernesto Gastaldi
Censored films
1960s Italian films
1960s French films